A Gesheft (The Deal) is a 2005 action film, with a religious message, in the Yiddish language, made by Haredi Jews from Monsey, New York. It is the first film made by Haredi Jews entirely in Yiddish. (In Israel, there is somewhat of an Haredi film industry; the language of choice for these films is Israeli Hebrew, however.) It is one of very few Yiddish films made since the destruction of most Yiddish-speaking communities by the Nazis. The film has been marketed primarily to an Orthodox audience, not without some controversy. It has also drawn attention from less traditionalist Jews with an interest in Yiddish, since it is a document of contemporary spoken Yiddish. For example, it was screened at the 2006 Ashkenaz Festival in Toronto, a mostly secular celebration of klezmer music and Yiddish culture.

Sources

References

External links 
 

2005 action films
2005 films
American action films
Films about religion
Haredi Judaism in New York (state)
Yiddish-language mass media in the United States
Yiddish-language films
Films about Orthodox and Hasidic Jews
2000s American films